Scialabba v. de Osorio, 573 U.S. 41 (2014), was a United States Supreme Court case in which the court found that lawful residents in the United States who turned twenty-one while their visa applications were being processed could not retain their original application date after "aging out" of eligibility for child-visas. Those "aged out" were moved to the bottom of the list of applicants for adult visas. The Ninth Circuit Court had originally agreed that provisions in the Child Status Protection Act allowed applicants to retain their date.

References

External links
 

2014 in United States case law
United States Supreme Court cases
United States Supreme Court cases of the Roberts Court
United States immigration and naturalization case law